The Derby City Roller Girls (DCRG) is a women's flat track roller derby league based in Louisville, Kentucky. Founded in 2007, the league currently consists of two teams, which compete against teams from other leagues. Derby City is a member of the Women's Flat Track Derby Association (WFTDA).

History
The league was founded in 2007 by Jenni Ahlrich, known as "Bad Penny", after she had met a team from Austin, Texas.  In its early days, it played at the Kentucky State Fairgrounds, often selling out the venue.

The league joined the Women's Flat Track Derby Association (WFTDA) in 2009, and played its first WFTDA regulation bout against the Naptown Roller Girls in January 2010.

WFTDA rankings

References

Women's sports in Kentucky
Sports teams in Louisville, Kentucky
Roller derby leagues established in 2007
Roller derby leagues in Kentucky
Women's Flat Track Derby Association Division 3
2007 establishments in Kentucky